Stictopleurus punctiventris is a species in the family Rhopalidae ("scentless plant bugs"), in the order Hemiptera ("true bugs, cicadas, hoppers, aphids and allies").
The distribution range of Stictopleurus punctiventris includes Central America and North America.

References

Further reading
 Arnett, Ross H. (2000). American Insects: A Handbook of the Insects of America North of Mexico. CRC Press.
 Henry, Thomas J., and Richard C. Froeschner, eds. (1988). Catalog of the Heteroptera, or True Bugs, of Canada and the Continental United States, xix + 958.
 Thomas J. Henry, Richard C. Froeschner. (1988). Catalog of the Heteroptera, True Bugs of Canada and the Continental United States. Brill Academic Publishers.

External links
NCBI Taxonomy Browser, Stictopleurus punctiventris

Insects described in 1852
Rhopalini